"Shout at the Devil" is a song by the American heavy metal band Mötley Crüe. Written by bassist Nikki Sixx, the song is the title track of their album of the same name. The song charted at No. 30 on the U.S. Mainstream Rock chart. It was also controversial, as were many other heavy metal songs, due to allegations that it encouraged devil worship.

The song was re-recorded by the band for their 1997 album Generation Swine, titled "Shout at the Devil '97".

Demo version 
In 1982, the band recorded a demo version of "Shout at the Devil". It was not released for many years until the 2003 remastered edition of the Shout at the Devil album. The demo version features a different intro and has slightly different lyrics.

In other media
A cover version appears in Guitar Hero II while the master recording appears in Guitar Hero Smash Hits.
The song also appears in Rocksmith 2014, along with four other songs from the band's career.
It was used as the entrance song for Brock Lesnar, during his first 3 MMA fights, at Dynamite!!! 2007, and in the UFC, and by New York Yankees pitcher Joba Chamberlain.
It appears in the TV show My Name Is Earl and the film Idle Hands.
A cover version appears in the Knight Rider episode "The Nineteenth Hole".
It is one of two Mötley Crüe songs that appears in the videogame Saints Row: The Third, the other being "Live Wire".
It is used in the Hardee's/Carl's Jr. commercial to promote the El Diablo Thickburger.
It is played at the Halloween party scene on "Trick or Treat, Freak", a Halloween episode of the second season of Stranger Things.

Charts

References 

1983 songs
Mötley Crüe songs
Songs written by Nikki Sixx
Song recordings produced by Tom Werman
Obscenity controversies in music